Mount Clemenceau is the fourth highest mountain in the Park Ranges of the Canadian Rockies. The peak was originally named "Pyramid" in 1892 by Arthur Coleman. The mountain was renamed by the Interprovincial Boundary Survey in 1919 to its present name, which is for Georges Clemenceau, premier of France during World War I.

Mt. Clemenceau was first climbed in 1923 by D.B. Durand, H.S. Hall, W.D. Harris and H.B. De V. Schwab.


Routes 
There are three standard climbing routes:
West Face II
This is the normal route, similar to the north glacier route (normal) on Mount Athabasca but considered more interesting. The route avoids the steepest parts of the face.
North-East Ridge IV
North Face IV

See also
List of mountains in the Canadian Rockies
List of mountain peaks of North America
List of mountain peaks of the Rocky Mountains

References

External links
 Mount Clemenceau aerial photo: PBase

Canadian Rockies
Three-thousanders of British Columbia
Kootenay Land District